Loganin is one of the best-known of the iridoid glycosides. It is named for the Loganiaceae, having first been isolated from the seeds of a member of that plant family, namely those of Strychnos nux-vomica. It also occurs in Alstonia boonei (Apocynaceae), a medicinal tree of West Africa and in the medicinal/entheogenic shrub Desfontainia spinosa (Columelliaceae) native to Central America and South America.

Biosynthesis
Loganin is formed from loganic acid by the enzyme loganic acid O-methyltransferase (LAMT).  Loganin then becomes a substrate for the enzyme secologanin synthase (SLS) to form secologanin, a secoiridoid monoterpene found as part of ipecac and terpene indole alkaloids.

References

Iridoid glycosides
Cyclopentanes